Neravy taluk (also called as Neravy Firka) is one of the six taluk of the Karaikal district, Puducherry Union Territory, India.This taluk contains 3 villages and 6 sub villages which is also called hamlets.

Villages in Neravy Taluk
The three villages in Neravy taluk are:
 Vizhithiyur
 Oduthurai
 Neravy

Sub villages in Neravy taluk
The six sub villages in Neravy taluk are:
 Vizhithiyur
 Kottupalayam
 Manamutti
 Kela Oduthurai
 Mela Oduthurai
 Neravy

References

Taluks of Karaikal district